Chickalah is an unincorporated community in Yell County, Arkansas, United States, located on Arkansas Highway 27,  west-southwest of Dardanelle.

References

External links
 Chickalah, Arkansas entry on the Encyclopedia of Arkansas History & Culture

Unincorporated communities in Yell County, Arkansas
Unincorporated communities in Arkansas
Arkansas placenames of Native American origin